Sheldrake or Shelldrake may refer to:

Places

Canada
Sheldrake, a settlement within the Municipality of Rivière-au-Tonnerre, Quebec
Sheldrake Island, New Brunswick
Sheldrake River, Nunavik, Quebec
Sheldrake River (Minganie), Côte-Nord, Quebec

United States
Loch Sheldrake, New York, a hamlet within the town of Fallsburg, Sullivan County, New York
Sheldrake Lake (New York), a reservoir within the city of New Rochelle, Westchester County, New York
Sheldrake Creek, Seneca County, New York
Sheldrake River, Westchester County, New York
Shelldrake River, Michigan
Shelldrake, Michigan, a ghost town

Persons
Khalid Sheldrake, British pickle manufacturer and self-proclaimed "King of Islamistan"
Merlin Sheldrake, English author and biologist 
Rupert Sheldrake, English author, lecturer and researcher
Cosmo Sheldrake, English musician, composer and producer

Other uses
Sheldrake, an alternate name of shelducks in the genus Tadorna
Sheldrake, a character in the 1950 Billy Wilder film Sunset Boulevard, played by Fred Clark
Jeff D. Sheldrake, a character in the 1960 Billy Wilder film The Apartment, played by Fred MacMurray
Dr Sheldrake, a character in the 1964 Billy Wilder film Kiss Me, Stupid, played by Mel Blanc
Percival Sheldrake and Cyril Sheldrake, fictional characters who adopt the British Batman Knight persona in DC comics